House of Councillors elections were held in Japan on 22 June 1980. On 16 May the Japan Socialist Party (JSP) brought no-confidence motion before the Diet relating to corruption issues, proposing more defense spending and rises in public utility charges as reasons for the House of Representatives to withdraw its backing from the government. Unexpectedly, 69 Liberal Democratic Party (LDP) members of the Diet from the Fukuda Takeo, Miki Takeo and Hidenao Nakagawa factions abstained from voting on the motion. The government was defeated by 56 votes in total of 243 and resigned. For the first time elections for both the House of Councillors and the House of Representatives were elected at the same time. In the elections of both the houses the LDP gained a majority.

Results

By constituency

References

About Japan Series (1999), Changing Japanese Politics, No. 24, Tokyo: Foreign Press Center.
Mahendra Prakash (2004), Coalition Experience in Japanese Politics: 1993-2003, New Delhi: JNU.
https://archive.today/20070712184335/http://www.binghamton.edu/cdp/era/elections/jpn80par.html

Japan
House of Councillors (Japan) elections
1980 elections in Japan
June 1980 events in Asia
Election and referendum articles with incomplete results